Brigham Dwaine Madsen (October 21, 1914 – December 24, 2010) was a historian of indigenous peoples of the American West, of the people of Utah and surrounding states, and of Mormonism. He was a professor at the University of Utah.

Madsen published six books on the Shoshone-Bannock. In later life, he became a proponent of 19th-century, as opposed to anciently, positioned Book of Mormon studies, with his edition of the previously unpublished, early-20th-century Studies of the Book of Mormon by B. H. Roberts (1857–1933).

Publications

Books

 
 University of Utah Press.,  
  University of Idaho Press

  University of Utah

Essays and pamphlets 
 Weber State College Press, 1984.

References

External links
 

Archives

1914 births
2010 deaths
20th-century American historians
American male non-fiction writers
American Latter Day Saint writers
University of California, Berkeley alumni
University of Utah faculty
Historians of the American West
Historians of the Latter Day Saint movement
Historians of Utah
Mountain Meadows Massacre
People from Salt Lake City
Writers from Utah
Latter Day Saints from Utah
People from Magna, Utah
Native American history
20th-century American male writers